Willie Rogers (born September 11, 1945) is a retired American professional basketball player who was selected by the Seattle SuperSonics in the 8th round (94th pick overall) of the 1968 NBA draft.

A 6'3" guard from the University of Oklahoma, Rogers played one season in the American Basketball Association (ABA). That year, he played in 40 games and scored 85 points. While at Oklahoma, Rogers scored 1,153 points to become the fourth leading scorer at the time. He remains among only 33 Sooners to have scored over 1,000 points at the university. Rogers was also the third-leading rebounder.

References

1945 births
Living people
American men's basketball players
Basketball players from Texas
Denver Rockets players
Oklahoma Sooners men's basketball players
People from Nacogdoches, Texas
Seattle SuperSonics draft picks